Robert Hawthorne Neale (May 3, 1914 – 1994) was the top flying ace with the American Volunteer Group (AVG), amassing 13 victories.

Neale left his studies at the University of Washington to enlist in the United States Navy in 1938. He became an aviator, receiving his wings in 1939, and was a dive-bomber pilot on the aircraft carrier , flying the Curtiss SBC Helldiver and Douglas SBD Dauntless. Ensign Neale resigned his commission to join the AVG of the Chinese Air Force in June 1941.

Neale took over the AVG's 1st Squadron (the "Adam & Eves") after its commander, Robert Sandy Sandell, was killed, and was decorated by the British government with the Distinguished Service Order for his exploits in the defense of Burma. Neale was one of the AVG pilots who volunteered two weeks' additional service in China after the group was disbanded; during that interim, he commanded the U.S. Army's 23rd Fighter Group—as a civilian—pending the arrival of the designated commander, Colonel Robert Scott. He declined a commission as a major in the United States Army Air Forces.  The AVG records credit him with 13 air-to-air victories, making him its top-scoring ace.

After returning to the United States, Neale served as a civilian transport or ferry pilot for Pan American World Airways. He was running a Camano Island fishing resort at the time of his death in 1994.

References

External links
Annals of the Flying Tigers

American World War II flying aces
United States Navy personnel of World War II
Aviators from Washington (state)
Companions of the Distinguished Service Order
Flying Tigers
United States Navy officers
1914 births
1994 deaths
People from Camano, Washington